Born in Palestine, Hussein Azzam was a former prisoner held in extrajudicial detention in the United States Guantanamo Bay detainment camps, in Cuba.

He was released in 2004, two years after his capture, without charge and returned home to his family.

According to the Department of Defense's official list of release dates, a captive listed as "Abdul Qadir Yousef Hussein" was transferred on March 31, 2004.  His Internment Serial Number was 715.

Life
The cousin of noted scholar Abdullah Azzam, Azzam studied Islamic law in Saudi Arabia and received his Master's degree before returning to Palestine, where he had trouble finding work as a teacher in the West Bank.

In 1985 he moved to Peshawar, Pakistan, as he heard that the country had begun setting up schools for the refugees flooding in from the Soviet invasion of Afghanistan.

He remained as a teacher in the region through the 2001 American invasion of Afghanistan, but was not targeted by any forces and reported that he felt no fear as he had no connection to local militants.

Arrest
Azzam's home was raided by Pakistani forces on May 25, 2002, and he was arrested along with his two sons, the 23-year-old Abdullah and 18-year-old Muhammad. The two boys were released, but Azzam was held.

He was transferred to the Bagram collection point facility, where he alleges he was sodomised and abused, before being flown to the Guantanamo detainment camps. He was interrogated five times over a captivity of 10 months.

After his arrest, his family moved back to Jordan to avoid persecution. However the increased cost of health care in the country meant that his son Abdullah's heart condition worsened, and he died in February 2004.

Release
Azzam was released on August 27, 2004, and returned to his family in Jordan.

References

Living people
Guantanamo detainees known to have been released
1973 births
Palestinian people imprisoned abroad